After the Triumph of Your Birth is a 2012 American drama film written and directed by Jim Akin. The film stars Tom Dunne, Tessa Ferrer, Bronagh Gallagher, Maria Mckee, Maria Doyle Kennedy and Rob Zabrecky. The film tells the story of Eli Willit, a haunted man who sets out on foot at the beginning of the film on a seven-day journey that will take him from the desert to the ocean. In need of spiritual cleansing, Eli's walkabout leads him not just to the water, but also through his life's memories, as we are presented with four separate-story lines dealing with spiritual fragility and the questioning of what constitutes existence and reality.

The musical score was composed by Jim Akin and Maria McKee.

References

External links
 
 

2012 films
2012 drama films
American drama films
2010s American films